Metimir is a village in the Bitola Municipality of North Macedonia. It used to be part of the former municipality of Capari.

Demographics
According to the 2002 census, the village had a total of 315 inhabitants. Ethnic groups in the village include:

Macedonians 9
Others 1

References

External links
 Visit Macedonia

Villages in Bitola Municipality